Ectopoglossus saxatilis is a species of frog in the family Dendrobatidae. It is known to be endemic to a small tributary of the Río Tanelita on the Colombian side of Cerro Tacarcuna, where it can be found in small streams and caves in the humid forests of the region, at around 1100 meters above sea level.

Ectopoglossus lacrimosus is brown in coloration, with golden-brown spots. The only measured specimen was a 24.6 mm long female.

References

Poison dart frogs
Amphibians of Colombia
Endemic fauna of Colombia
Amphibians described in 2017